Raúl Savoy (11 November 1940 – 10 December 2003) was an Argentine footballer. He played in 17 matches for the Argentina national football team from 1963 to 1968. He was also part of Argentina's squad for the 1963 South American Championship.

References

External links
 
 

1940 births
2003 deaths
Argentine footballers
Argentina international footballers
Place of birth missing
Association football midfielders
Chacarita Juniors footballers
Club Atlético Independiente footballers
Boca Juniors footballers
Liverpool F.C. (Montevideo) players
Argentine expatriate footballers
Expatriate footballers in Uruguay
Miami Toros players
Expatriate soccer players in the United States